Go Soeda was the defending champion, but chose not to defend his title.

Sergiy Stakhovsky won the title after defeating Lu Yen-hsun 4–6, 6–3, 7–6(9–7) in the final.

Seeds

Draw

Finals

Top half

Bottom half

References
 Main Draw
 Qualifying Draw

Lecoq Seoul Open
2016 Singles